Hasidic New Wave is an American experimental klezmer music group. Its members, all of whom were improvisational jazz musicians from downtown Manhattan, formed for the purpose of fusing Hasidic musical styles (such as freylekhs and horas) with elements of jazz, funk, and avant-garde rock. The band's eclectic style has been compared to Sun Ra and Jimi Hendrix.

Band members on their 5 recordings include Greg Wall (tenor saxophone), Frank London (trumpet; also a member of The Klezmatics), David Fiuczynski (guitar), Aaron Alexander (drums and percussion), 
and Kenny Davis or Fima Ephron (bass).

Greg Wall and Frank London originally met at the New England Conservatory of Music (where they both studied jazz) and reconnected in New York, when they both begun learning Hasidic music to play wedding gigs supporting themselves. A lot of that music made its way into Hasidic New Wave recordings.

Their focus became the Hasidic "nigunim", meditative chants, which they played in wrapped in jazz / acid rock arrangements.

The latest Hasidic New Wave release is the retrospective 5-CD boxset, out from Tzadik Records in late 2012.

Previously, the band has recorded 5 CDs, including four on Knitting Factory's Jewish Alternative Movement label and one on Not Two Records from Poland - a live recording at the Kraków Jewish Music Festival from 1998.

Discography
1996 - Jews and the Abstract Truth (Knitting Factory Works KFW 192)
1998 - Psycho-Semitic (Knitting Factory Records KFR 203)
1999 - Kabalogy (Knitting Factory Records KFR 239)
2000 - Live in Kraków (Not Two Records MW 706-2)
2001 - From the Belly of Abraham (with Yakar Rhythms) (Knitting Factory Records KFW 294)

External links
 Official site
 Liner notes to Hasidic New Wave's box-set, released by Tzadik Records in 2012
 [ Hasidic New Wave on allmusic.com]
 Aaron Alexander's Site

Hasidic New Wave
Hasidic New Wave
Klezmer groups
Jewish rock groups